Reservoir Bus Company was a privately owned bus and coach operator in Melbourne, Australia. As a Melbourne bus company, it operated 10 bus routes under contract to the Government of Victoria. The company was bought by Dysons Group in November 2012, and its branding was gradually replaced by Dysons branding. Its website closed in 2017 and redirected to the Dysons website until 2019.

History
Reservoir Bus Company was formed in December 1968 when the business of East Preston-Epping Bus Service was purchased.

In August 1980 East West Bus Company was formed as a joint venture with Dysons to operate route 560 Broadmeadows station to Greensborough. Route 560 ceased in April 2010 being replaced by SmartBus route 902.

In April 1998 Melbourne Bus Link, another joint venture with Dysons, was formed to operate services previously operated by Met Bus in the western and south-east regions of Melbourne. These services were taken over by Transdev Melbourne in July 2013.

In November 2012 the Dyson Group purchased Reservoir Bus Company, including the Midland Tours brand. The brand was gradually replaced by the Dysons branding until 2017.

Fleet
As at May 2013 the fleet consists of 56 buses and coaches. Fleet livery is white with maroon and blue stripes.

See also
Buses in Melbourne
List of Victorian Bus Companies
List of Melbourne bus routes

References

External links

Reservoir Bus Company website (2017 archive)
Midland Tours website (2016 archive)
Public Transport Victoria timetables

Bus companies of Victoria (Australia)
Bus transport in Melbourne
Australian companies established in 1968